H. J. Gillespie (died 1950) was a British socialist activist who was also prominent in the women's suffrage movement.

Gillespie joined the Fabian Society in 1911 and soon came to prominence, serving as honorary secretary of its Research Department in 1913.  That year, he was also elected to the executives of the Men’s Political Union for Women’s Enfranchisement and the Railway Nationalisation Society.   He was a founder member of the United Suffragists, along with Agnes Harben and her husband, serving as its treasurer in 1914. Gillespie then joined the Royal Field Artillery to fight in the First World War, rising to become a major, and receiving the Distinguished Service Order.

Gillespie was still supportive of the labour movement immediately after the war, writing a testimonial for the Daily Herald, but he later drifted away, and wrote a book, Why I Gave Up Socialism. In the 1930s, he became the secretary of the Mining Association of Great Britain.

References

Year of birth missing
1950 deaths
Companions of the Distinguished Service Order
Members of the Fabian Society
Royal Field Artillery officers